Peter Kullgren (born 17 May 1981) is a Swedish politician for the Christian Democrats. Since 18 October 2022 he is the Minister of Rural affairs in the Ulf Kristersson cabinet.

References

1981 births
Living people
Christian Democrats (Sweden) politicians
Government ministers of Sweden